General Ghulam Ali Wahdat is a Hazara politician from Afghanistan. He served as governor of Bamyan province from (October, 2013 to June, 2015).

Early life 
Ghulam Ali Wahdat, son of Nawazesh Ali, was born on 22 March 1955 in Yakawlang district of Bamiyan province. In 1978 he graduated from the Faculty of Economics in Kabul University and joined the police force.
Wahdat was a professional general officer of the Afghan Army during the rule of Dr. Najib in the 1980s, he has worked at various positions at the time of jihad with the Hezbe Wahdat Party of Afghanistan.

References 

Living people
1962 births
Hazara politicians
Hezbe Wahdat politicians
Governors of Bamyan Province
People from Bamyan Province